HMS Forth was a 44-gun  fifth-rate frigate built for the Royal Navy during the 1820s, one of three ships of the Andromeda sub-class. After completion in 1833, she was ordered to be converted into a steam-powered ship in 1845, but this did not happen for another decade.

Description
The Andromeda sub-class was a slightly enlarged and improved version of the Druid sub-class, with a more powerful armament. The ship's tonnage was 1228  tons burthen. The Andromeda sub-class was armed with twenty-six 18-pounder cannon on her gundeck, ten 32-pounder carronades and a pair of 68-pounder guns on her quarterdeck and four more 32-pounder carronades in the forecastle. The ships had a crew of 315 officers and ratings.

Construction and career
Forth, the second ship of her name to serve in the Royal Navy, was ordered on 9 June 1825, laid down in November 1828 at Pembroke Dockyard, Wales, and launched on 1 August 1830. She was completed for ordinary at Plymouth Dockyard on 2 September 1833.

Notes

References

External links
 

Seringapatam-class frigate
1833 ships
Ships built in Pembroke Dock